The fifth Connecticut House of Representatives district elects one member of the Connecticut House of Representatives. Its current representative is Maryam Khan. The district consists of the northeastern part of the city of Hartford, which includes the Blue Hills, Clay-Arsenal neighborhoods and Downtown Hartford. The district is one of few in Connecticut to have a Black majority population. Owing to this fact, it is one of the safest House districts in Connecticut for Democrats.

It has been represented by Maryam Khan since March 1, 2022.

List of representatives

Recent elections

External links 
 Google Maps – Connecticut House Districts

References 

05
Hartford, Connecticut